The flag of Minneapolis is the official municipal flag of Minneapolis, Minnesota.

Design and symbolism
On May 27, 1955, Minneapolis City Council unanimously adopted a new design for its flag. The flag and its symbols were described in the resolution as such:

History

The flag of Minneapolis was designed in 1955 by Louise Sundin as part of a contest. She received a $250 U.S. Savings Bond as her prize. The Minneapolis City Council adopted it as the official flag of the city on May 27, 1955. A 2004 North American Vexillological Association survey of 150 American city flags put Minneapolis' design at 27th place. Gizmodo, however, put the flag on their list of the worst city flags, saying it was "too simple".

References

Further reading

External links
The City Clerk of Minneapolis's page on the flag

Flag
Flags of cities in Minnesota
Flags introduced in 1955
1955 establishments in Minnesota